SATB1 (special AT-rich sequence-binding protein-1) is a protein which in humans is encoded by the SATB1 gene.

Function 

SATB1, the global chromatin organizer and transcription factor, has emerged as a key factor integrating higher-order chromatin architecture with gene regulation. Recent studies have unraveled the role of SATB1 in organization of chromatin 'loopscape' and its dynamic nature in response to physiological stimuli. At genome-wide level, SATB1 seems to play a role in organization of the transcriptionally poised chromatin. SATB1 organizes the MHC class-I locus into distinct chromatin loops by tethering MARs to nuclear matrix at fixed distances. Silencing of SATB1 mimics the effects of IFN-γ treatment on chromatin loop architecture of the MHC class I locus and altered expression of genes within the locus. SATB1 has also been shown to induce breast cancer tumor growth and metastasis through the altered expression of large numbers of genes.

Clinical significance 

Heterozygous variants in SATB1 have been identified in a neurodevelopmental disorder with teeth abnormalities and epilepsy.

Interactions 

SATB1 has been shown to interact with:

 BAZ1A,
 CHD4, 
 CUTL1, 
 HDAC1, 
 MTA2, 
 POLR2J  and
 SMARCA5.

References

Further reading